Murad II (16 June 1404 – 3 February 1451) was the sultan of the Ottoman Empire from 1421 to 1444 and again from 1446 to 1451.

Murad II's reign was a period of important economic development. Trade increased and Ottoman cities expanded considerably. In 1432, the traveller Bertrandon de la Broquière noted that Ottoman annual revenue had risen to 2,500,000 ducats, and that if Murad II had used all available resources he could easily have invaded Europe.

Early life 
Murad was born in June 1404 (or 1403) to Sultan Mehmed I. The identity of his mother is disputed. According to 15th century historian Şükrullah, Murad's mother was a concubine. Hüseyin Hüsâmeddin Yasar, an early 20th century historian, wrote in his work Amasya Tarihi, that his mother was Şehzade Hatun, daughter of Divitdar Ahmed Pasha. According to historians İsmail Hami Danişmend, and Heath W. Lowry, his mother was Emine Hatun, daughter of Şaban Suli Bey, ruler of the Dulkadirids.

He spent his early childhood in Amasya. In 1410, Murad came along with his father to the Ottoman capital, Edirne. After his father ascended to the Ottoman throne, he made Murad governor of the Amasya Sanjak. Murad remained at Amasya until the death of Mehmed I in 1421. He was solemnly recognized as sultan of the Ottoman Sultanate at sixteen years of age, girded with the Sword of Osman at Bursa, and the troops and officers of the state willingly paid homage to him as their sovereign.

Reign

Accession and first reign

Murad's reign was troubled by insurrection early on. The Byzantine Emperor, Manuel II, released the 'pretender' Mustafa Çelebi (known as Düzmece Mustafa) from confinement and acknowledged him as the legitimate heir to the throne of Bayezid I (1389–1402). The Byzantine Emperor had first secured a stipulation that Mustafa should, if successful, repay him for his liberation by giving up a large number of important cities. The pretender was landed by the Byzantine galleys in the European dominion of the sultan and for a time made rapid progress. Many Ottoman soldiers joined him, and he defeated and killed the veteran general Bayazid Pasha, whom Murad had sent to fight him. Mustafa defeated Murad's army and declared himself Sultan of Adrianople (modern Edirne). He then crossed the Dardanelles to Asia with a large army but Murad out-manoeuvered Mustafa. Mustafa's force passed over in large numbers to Murad II. Mustafa took refuge in the city of Gallipoli, but the sultan, who was greatly aided by a Genoese commander named Adorno, besieged him there and stormed the place. Mustafa was taken and put to death by the sultan, who then turned his arms against the Roman emperor and declared his resolution to punish the Palaiologos for their unprovoked enmity by the capture of Constantinople.

Murad II then formed a new army called Azeb in 1421 and marched through the Byzantine Empire and laid siege to Constantinople. While Murad was besieging the city, the Byzantines, in league with some independent Turkish Anatolian states, sent the sultan's younger brother Küçük Mustafa (who was only 13 years old) to rebel against the sultan and besiege Bursa. Murad had to abandon the siege of Constantinople in order to deal with his rebellious brother. He caught Prince Mustafa and executed him. The Anatolian states that had been constantly plotting against him — Aydinids, Germiyanids, Menteshe and Teke — were annexed and henceforth became part of the Ottoman Sultanate.

Murad II then declared war against Venice, the Karamanid Emirate, Serbia and Hungary. The Karamanids were defeated in 1428 and Venice withdrew in 1432 following the defeat at the second Siege of Thessalonica in 1430. In the 1430s Murad captured vast territories in the Balkans and succeeded in annexing Serbia in 1439. In 1441 the Holy Roman Empire and Poland joined the Serbian-Hungarian coalition. Murad II won the Battle of Varna in 1444 against John Hunyadi.

Abdication and second reign
Murad II relinquished his throne in 1444 to his son Mehmed II, but a Janissary revolt in the Empire forced him to return.

In 1448 he defeated the Christian coalition at the Second Battle of Kosovo (the first one took place in 1389). When the Balkan front was secured, Murad II turned east to defeat Timur's son, Shah Rokh, and the emirates of Karamanid and Çorum-Amasya. In 1450 Murad II led his army into Albania and unsuccessfully besieged the Castle of Kruje in an effort to defeat the resistance led by Skanderbeg. In the winter of 1450–1451, Murad II fell ill, and died in Edirne. He was succeeded by his son Mehmed II (1451–1481).

As Ghazi Sultan
When Murad ascended to the throne, he sought to regain the lost Ottoman territories that had reverted to autonomy following his grandfather Bayezid I’s defeat at the Battle of Ankara in 1402 at the hands of Timur. He needed the support of both the public and the nobles “who would enable him to exercise his rule”, and utilized the old and potent Islamic trope of Ghazi King.

In order to gain popular, international support for his conquests, Murad II modeled himself after the legendary Ghazi kings of old. The Ottomans already presented themselves as ghazis, painting their origins as rising from the ghazas of Osman, the founder of the dynasty. For them, ghaza was the noble championing of Islam and justice against non-Muslims and Muslims alike, if they were cruel; for example, Bayezid I labeled Timur Lang, also a Muslim, an apostate prior to the Battle of Ankara because of the violence his troops had committed upon innocent civilians and because “all you do is to break promises and vows, shed blood, and violate the honor of women.”  Murad II only had to capitalize on this dynastic inheritance of doing ghaza, which he did by actively crafting the public image of Ghazi Sultan.

After his accession, there was a flurry of translating and compiling activity where old Persian, Arab, and Anatolian epics were translated into Turkish so Murad II could uncover the ghazi king legends.  He drew from the noble behavior of the nameless Caliphs in the Battalname, an epic about a fictional Arab warrior who fought against the Byzantines, and modelled his actions on theirs.  He was careful to embody the simplicity, piety, and noble sense of justice that was part of the Ghazi King persona.

For example, the Caliph in Battalname saw the battle turning in his enemy's favor, and got down from his horse and prayed, after which the battle ended in a victory for him. In the Battle of Varna in 1444, Murad II saw the Hungarians gaining the upper hand, and he got down from his horse and prayed just like the Caliph, and soon after, the tide turned in the Ottoman's favor and the Hungarian king Wladyslaw was killed.  Similarly, the Caliph in the epic roused his warriors by saying “Those of you who die will be martyrs. Those of you who kill will be ghazis”; before the Battle of Varna, Murad II repeated these words to his army, saying “Those of us who kill will be ghazis; those of us who die will be martyrs.”  In another instance, since the Ghazi King is meant to be a just and fair, when Murad took Thessalonica in the Balkans, he took care to keep the troops in check and prevented widespread looting.  Finally, just as the fictional Caliph's ghazas were immortalized in Battalname, Murad II's battles and victories were also compiled and given the title "The Ghazas of Sultan Murad" (Gazavat- i Sultan Murad).

Murad II successfully painted himself as a simple soldier who did not partake in royal excesses, and as a noble ghazi sultan who sought to consolidate Muslim power against non-Muslims such as the Venetians and Hungarians. Through this self-presentation, he got the support of the Muslim population of not only the Ottoman territories, for both himself and his extensive, expensive campaigns, but also the greater Muslim populations in the Dar-al-Islam – such as the Mamluks and the Muslim Delhi Sultanates of India. Murad II was basically presenting himself not only as “a ghazi king who fights caffres [non-muslims], but also serves as protector and master of lesser ghazis.”

Family

Consorts
Murad II had six known consorts:
Halime Hatice Hatun (? - 1440). Daughter of İsfendiyar Bey, the ruler of Isfendiyarids. Called also Alime Hatun. She married Murad in 1420.
Hüma Hatun (? - September 1449). Mother of Mehmed II, was long believed to be a French princess, information then debunked. According to tradition, she was of Italian and/or Jewish origins and her original name was Stella or Esther. 
Mara Hatun ( 1420 - 14 September 1487). Born Maria Branković, daughter of Despot of Serbia Durad Branković. She married Murad in September 1435, when she was very young. She never converted to Islam, remaining a Christian. In Europe she became known as Sultanina or Sultana Maria. Considered the "adoptive mother" of Mehmed II, who respected her a lot and called her that in official documents. 
Yeni Hatun, daughter of Şadgeldi Paşahzade Mustafa Bey of the Kutluşah of Amasya. 
 Hundi Ümmügülsüm Hatun (? - 14 February 1486). May have been two separate consorts.
Hatice Hatun. Daughter of Ibrahim II Bey, brother of Halime. She married Murad in 1440, after her aunt died.

Sons
Murad II had at least eight sons:
 Şehzade Ahmed (1419 - 1420). Also called Büyük Ahmed (Ahmed the elder). 
 Şehzade Alaeddin Ali (1425 - June 1443) - with Hundi Ümmügülsüm Hatun. Murad's favorite son, he was governor of Manisa and Amasya. In 1443 he took part in the expedition of Karaman and died on his way back from a fall from his horse. Buried in Muradiye Complex of Bursa. He had a known consort, Yeni Hatun, and two sons: Şehzade Giyaşüddin (1441-1445) and Şehzade Taceddin (1442 - 1443).
 Şehzade Isfendiyâr (1425 - 1425) - with Halime Hatun.
 Şehzade Hüseyn (? - 1449). Died young. 
 Şehzade Orhan (? - 1441). Died young. 
 Şehzade Hasan (? - 1444). Died young. 
 Mehmed II the Conqueror (1432 - 1481) - with Hüma Hatun. Sultan of the Ottoman Empire after his father and conqueror of Constantinople. 
 Şehzade Ahmed (1450 - 18 February 1451) - with Hatice Hatun. Known as Küçük Ahmed (Ahmed the younger). Killed by Mehmed II while his mother congratulated him on ascending the throne. Later, he legalized his act with the promulgation of the "Law of fratricide".

Daughters
Murad II had at least six daughters:
 Hundi Hatun (1423 - ?) - with Hundi Ümmügülsüm Hatun. Also called Erhundi Hatun. She married first Mirahur İlyas Bey and later Yaqub Bey, royal tutor of Şehzade Cem, son of Mehmed II. 
 Hatice Hatun (1425 - after 1470) - with Hüma Hatun. She married Candaroğlu İsmail Kemaleddin Bey and had three sons: Hasan Bey, Yahya Bey and Mahmud Bey. Her descendants were still alive during the reign of Abdulmejid I, in the 19th century. 
 Hafsa Hatun (1426 - ?). She married her cousin Candaroğlu Kaya Bey, son of her aunt Ilaldi Sultan Hatun, daughter of Mehmed I. They had a son, Candaroğlu Kasim Bey. 
 Fatma Hatun (1430 - after 1464) - with Hüma Hatun. She married Zaganos Pasha and had two sons: Hamza Bey and Ahmed Çelebî, who would become an important adviser to his cousin Bayezid II. After divorced in 1462, she married Mahmud Çelebi. 
 Şahzade Selçuk Hatun (1430 - 1480). She was married twice, first to Güveyi Karaça Paşah (d. 1456) and then to Yusuf Sinaneddin Paşah (d.1486). She was buried next to Şehzade Alaeddin Ali.
 Ilaldi Hatun. She married Kasim Bey, the son of Isfendyaroghlu of Sinop.

Portrayals 
Murad II is portrayed by İlker Kurt in 2012 film Fetih 1453, by Vahram Papazian in the Albanian movie The Great Warrior Skanderbeg in 1953, and by Tolga Tekin in the 2020 Netflix series Rise of Empires: Ottoman.

References

Attribution

Further reading
 
 Harris, Jonathan, The End of Byzantium. New Haven and London: Yale University Press, 2010. 
 Imber, Colin, The Ottoman Empire. London: Palgrave/Macmillan, 2002.

External links

Encyclopædia Britannica
	
Alaeddin Ali Çelebi (1425 – 1443, buried in Muradiye Complex, Bursa);
Mehmed the Conqueror (1431 – 3 May 1481, buried in Fatih Mosque, Istanbul) – with Hüma Hatun;
Yusuf Adil Shah (possibly) (1450 – 1510, buried in India);
Yusuf Adil Shah (possibly) (1450 – 1510, buried in India);
Orhan Çelebi (died 1453, buried in Darülhadis Mausoleum, Edirne);

1404 births
1451 deaths
15th-century Ottoman sultans
Burials in Turkey
Muslims of the Crusade of Varna
Ottoman people of the Byzantine–Ottoman wars
People from Amasya